Stan Brookes (born 2 February 1953) is an English former footballer who played for Doncaster Rovers and KV Mechelen as a defender. He attended the Percy Jackson Grammar School, Doncaster, 1964 entrant.

Senior club career

Doncaster Rovers
After playing in Doncaster Rovers Juniors Brookes signed a professional contract with  club, then in English Division 4, in February 1971. His debut came in a 1–0 home defeat to Barrow on 28 August 1971. His first goal came in the following season on 20 February in a 2–1 win at Chester City.

In April 1974 he took over in goal in a game against Exeter City. Rovers were losing 2–0 at the time and came back to draw 3–3.

He made a total of 263 League and Cup appearances, scoring 7 goals, it was at the end of the 1972–73 season

KV Mechelen
Along with fellow Brit Keith Coleman from West Ham, Brookes joined KV Mechelen of the Belgian Second Division for the 1977–78 season, managed by John Talbut. He stayed there for 6 seasons, including one in the First Division.

Honours
Doncaster Rovers
Sheffield and Hallamshire County Cup winner 1975–76
KV Mechelen
Belgian Second Division play-offs winner 1980–81
Belgian Second Division winner 1982–83

References

1953 births
Living people
Footballers from Doncaster
English footballers
English Football League players
Belgian Pro League players
Expatriate footballers in Belgium
Association football defenders
Doncaster Rovers F.C. players
K.V. Mechelen players